The 6 Hours of Vallelunga (6 Ore di Vallelunga in Italian), also called 6 Hours of Rome (6 Ore di Roma in Italian), is an endurance sports car racing event held annually at the ACI Vallelunga Circuit in Vallelunga, Italy.

First established in 1973, the six-hour race was initially held as a round of the World Championship for Makes until 1980, when it was no longer included in the World Championship calendar. It was not until 1994 that a six-hour race returned to Vallelunga, briefly part of the Italian GT Championship calendar in 1995 and later in 1999. It was also part of the brief Italian Endurance Challenge in 1997 and 1998.

The event, currently organized by Peroni Promotion, now runs as a non-championship endurance held as a double weekend in the late autumn and is attended by several international teams.

Winners

References 

Vallelunga
Sports car races
Auto races in Italy
Endurance motor racing